Stenopogon breviusculus is a species of robber fly (i.e. an insect in the family Asilidae).

References

Asilidae
Articles created by Qbugbot
Insects described in 1872